Keskiniemi Light is a sector light tower located in the northwestern promontory of Hailuoto island in the Gulf of Bothnia in Finland. It is located next to the Keskiniemi beacon tower built in 1858.

Keskiniemi Light is a square steel skeletal tower with white octagonal lantern and gallery. The focal plane of the light is 8.8 metres (29 ft) and it has a range of 6.5 nautical miles. The beacon displays a white flash every 6 seconds, visible in all directions. The tower also has a radar reflector on the northwest side.

There is an old storage shed for gas bottles next to the tower. This shed is currently unused, and the beacon has been converted to electric light.

Sources
 
 

Gulf of Bothnia
Hailuoto
Lighthouses in Finland
Buildings and structures in North Ostrobothnia